In the mathematical field of probability, the Wiener sausage is a neighborhood of the trace of a Brownian motion up to a time t, given by taking all points within a fixed distance of  Brownian motion. It can be visualized as a sausage of fixed radius whose centerline is Brownian motion. The Wiener sausage was named after Norbert Wiener  by  because of its relation to the Wiener process; the name is also a pun on Vienna sausage, as "Wiener" is German for "Viennese".

The Wiener sausage is one of the simplest non-Markovian functionals of Brownian motion. Its applications include stochastic phenomena including heat conduction.

Definitions
The Wiener sausage Wδ(t) of radius δ and length t is the set-valued random variable on Brownian paths b (in some Euclidean space) defined by
 is the set of points within a distance δ of some point b(x) of the path b with 0≤x≤t.

Volume of the Wiener sausage

There has been a lot of work on the behavior of the volume (Lebesgue measure) |Wδ(t)| of the Wiener sausage as it becomes thin (δ→0); by rescaling, this is essentially equivalent to studying the volume as the sausage becomes long (t→∞).

 showed that in 3 dimensions the expected value of the volume of the sausage is

In dimension d at least 3 the volume of the Wiener sausage is asymptotic to

as t tends to infinity. , a student of Spitzer, proved similar results for generalizations of Wiener sausages with cross sections given by more general compact sets  than balls.

References

 Especially chapter 22.

 (Reprint of 1964 edition)
 An advanced monograph covering the Wiener sausage.

Mathematical physics
Statistical mechanics
Wiener process